István Gulyás (14 October 1931 – 31 July 2000) was the second Hungarian male tennis player to become a Grand Slam finalist.  He was defeated in the 1966 French Open Men's final by Tony Roche of Australia in three sets, after allowing the match to be delayed 24 hours to allow Roche to recover from an ankle injury.  It was Gulyas' lone Grand Slam final, though he made the semi-finals of the tournament the following year (and the quarter-finals in 1971). He was ranked inside the world's Top 10 on more than one occasion and holds the record for most Hungarian National Championship titles having won it 15 times in his career. Lance Tingay of The Daily Telegraph ranked Gulyás as world No. 8 in 1966.

Grand Slam finals

Singles: 1 (0-1)

Grand Slam tournament performance timeline

Singles

References

External links
 
 
 

Hungarian male tennis players
1931 births
2000 deaths
Sportspeople from Pécs